Year 1358 (MCCCLVIII) was a common year starting on Monday (link will display the full calendar) of the Julian calendar.

Events 
 January–December 
 January 10 – Muhammad II as Said becomes ruler of the Marinid dynasty in modern-day Morocco after the assassination of Abu Inan Faris.
 February 11 – Mohammed Shah I becomes Bahmani Sultan of Deccan (part of modern-day southern India) after the death of Sultan Ala-ud-Din Bahman Shah.
 February 18 – Treaty of Zadar, between Louis I of Hungary/Croatia and the Republic of Venice: The Venetians lose influence over their former Dalmatian holdings.
 March 16 – King Haakon VI of Norway designates the city of Skien as a city with trading privileges, making it the sixth town with city status in Norway.
 May 28 – Hundred Years' War: The Jacquerie – A peasant rebellion begins in France, which consumes the Beauvais, and allies with Étienne Marcel's seizure of Paris. 
 June 27 – The Republic of Ragusa is founded.
 July 10 – Battle of Mello: The Jacquerie rebellion is defeated by a coalition of nobles, led by Charles II of Navarre.

 Date unknown 
 Mubariz al-Din Muhammad, leader of the Arab Muzaffarid tribe, expels the Blue Horde from Ilkhanate territory in Persia. The Muzaffarid then release control of the Il-Khanate, after being marched on by the Mongol Jalayirid tribe, ruled by Shaikh Uvais. Shaikh Uvais becomes the new Il-Khan. The Ilkhanate is effectively now disbanded, and replaced by the Jalayirid dynasty of Persia.
 Shah Shuja overthrows his father, Mubarazuddin Muhammad, as leader of the Muzaffarid tribe.
 Estimation: Nanjing in Mongolian China becomes the largest city of the world, taking the lead from Hangzhou in Mongolian China.

Births 
 February 20 – Eleanor of Aragon, queen of John I of Castile (d. 1382)
 August 24 – King John I of Castile (d. 1390)
 September 25 – Ashikaga Yoshimitsu, Japanese shōgun (d. 1408)
 date unknown 
 Ide Pedersdatter Falk, Danish noblewoman (d. 1399)
 Anne of Auvergne, Sovereign Dauphine of Auvergne and Countess of Forez (d. 1417)

Deaths 
 January 6 – Gertrude van der Oosten, Dutch beguine 
 January 10 – Abu Inan Faris, Marinid ruler of Morocco (b. 1329)
 February 11 – Ala-ud-Din Bahman Shah, first Bahmani Sultan of Deccan
 June 7 – Ashikaga Takauji, Japanese shōgun (b. 1305)
 July 31 – Étienne Marcel, Provost of the merchants of Paris
 August 16 – Albert II, Duke of Austria (b. 1298)
 August 22 – Isabella of France, queen of Edward II of England (b. 1295)
 November – Gregory of Rimini, Italian philosopher
 date unknown
 Brian MacCathmhaoil, Irish Bishop of Clogher
 Guillaume Cale, French peasant revolutionary (executed)

References